Ludogorets II or Ludogorets 2 is a Bulgarian professional football team based in Razgrad. Founded in 2015, it is the reserve team of PFC Ludogorets Razgrad, and currently plays in Second League, the second level of Bulgarian football.

Obliged to play one level below their main side, Ludogorets II is ineligible for promotion to First League and also can not compete in the Bulgarian Cup.

History

Foundation
In the beginning of 2015, the Bulgarian Football Union discussed the idea to add the reserve sides of several A Group clubs in the B Group or in the lower regional divisions. Ludogorets Razgrad, Litex Lovech, Levski Sofia, CSKA Sofia, Cherno More Varna and Botev Plovdiv expressed such interest to have a team in the B Group. At the beginning of June 2015, the BFU announced that only Litex and Ludogorets have sent such applications. Eventually, Ludogorets II and Litex II were added to the 2015-16 B Group.

2015–present: Second League
The team finished on 7th position in their first season. The team started the 2016–17 season precariously and finished in the relegation zone after the half season. That's why on 12 January 2017, the team announced Radoslav Zdravkov, a Bulgarian football legend and also frequent assistant coach in the Bulgarian national team in recent age. 2 days later from Ludogorets announced that in order to get better results from second team, they would apply big changes. Radoslav Zdravkov was announced as a head coach with Galin Ivanov and Marcelo Chagas for assistants and one other Bulgarian legend, Spas Dzhevizov, was announced as a selectionist, and will look after for youth talents from Ludogorets Academy and other academies to join the team.

On 29 March 2017, the new youth stadium, Eagles' Nest was finished and the second team would play on it. The stadium has 2,000 seats.

From the 2017–18 season, Ludogorets change the politic about the second team by taking the decision to play with only youth players of the club in the Bulgarian Second League. The team started the season against Lokomotiv Sofia and beat them with 2:1 result with a team average age being 19 years.

In the 2020–21 season, the team finished on their highest league position and ended the season on 4th place.

Players

For recent transfers, see Transfers summer 2022.
 For first team players, see Ludogorets Razgrad.

Personnel

Manager history

Current technical body

Past seasons

League positions

Statistics

Second League matches

Players in bold are still playing for Ludogorets.

Second League goals

Players in bold are still playing for Ludogorets.

Notable players

Note: This list includes players that have appeared in at least 100 top league games and/or have reached international status.

  Denislav Aleksandrov
  Georgi Argilashki
  Tsvetelin Chunchukov
  Antonio Georgiev
  Ventsislav Kerchev
  Branimir Kostadinov
  Svetoslav Kovachev
  Daniel Naumov
  Hristo Popadiyn
  Slavcho Shokolarov
  Georgi Terziev
  Aleksandar Vasilev
  Dominik Yankov
  Ivan Yordanov
  Choco

References

External links
Official website

Ludogorets
Association football clubs established in 2015
2015 establishments in Bulgaria
PFC Ludogorets Razgrad
Ludogorets R